Seguieria is a genus of flowering plants belonging to the family Petiveriaceae.

Its native range is southern America. It is found in Argentina, Bolivia, Brazil (northern, north-east, southern, south-east and west-central), Colombia, Costa Rica, Ecuador, French Guiana, Guyana, Panamá, Paraguay, Peru, Suriname, Trinidad, Tobago and Venezuela.

The genus name of Seguieria is in honour of Jean-François Séguier (1703–1784), a French archaeologist, epigraphist, astronomer and botanist from Nîmes. 
It was first described and published in Iter Hispan. on page 191 in 1758.

Known species
According to Kew:
 Seguieria aculeata Jacq. 
 Seguieria americana L.
 Seguieria brevithyrsa H.Walter
 Seguieria langsdorffii Moq.
 Seguieria macrophylla Benth.
 Seguieria paraguayensis Morong

References

Petiveriaceae
Caryophyllales genera
Plants described in 1758
Flora of Costa Rica
Flora of Panama
Flora of northern South America
Flora of western South America
Flora of Brazil
Flora of Northeast Argentina
Flora of Northwest Argentina